Asaichi Tamai (December 25, 1902 – December 10, 1964) was a captain in the Imperial Japanese Navy during  World War II.

Early life
Tamai was born in the Ehime Prefecture, attended Matsuyama Middle School in Matsuyama and graduated in 1924. In December 1925 he was appointed lieutenant in the Japanese navy. He cleared pilot licensing and certification in November 1929.

See also
Yukio Seki

References 

1902 births
1964 deaths
Japanese military personnel of World War II
Military personnel from Ehime Prefecture